= Anne Méaux =

French businesswoman

Anne Méaux is a French businesswoman. She is the president and founder of Image 7, a communications consulting company.

== Awards and honors ==
Méaux was made a Chevalier de la Légion d'honneur in 2007. In 2016, she was made an officier by the government of Emmanuel Macron.
